Farron is an unincorporated community in Yakima County, Washington, United States, located approximately five miles southwest of Wapato.

The small community developed along the Toppenish, Simcoe and Western Railway Company railway around 1909.

References

Northern Pacific Railway
Unincorporated communities in Yakima County, Washington
Unincorporated communities in Washington (state)